The Azores Regional Election, 2016 was on October 16 of the same year. In this election, the incumbent president of the regional government, led by the Socialist Vasco Cordeiro, was seeking a second term.

In this election, the PS maintained their absolute majority but lost one seat and lost 2.6% of the vote compared to 2012. The Social Democrats also lost one seat although their vote share fall was lower than the Socialists. The big winner was the People's Party which gain 7% of the vote and gained one seat compared to 2012. The Left Bloc also won one more seat compared to last time while the CDU maintained their only seat but at the same time, gained in share of the vote and was the most voted party in the island of Flores. The PPM also maintained their seat in the island of Corvo.

Turnout in this election was the lowest ever, as only 40.84% of the electorate cast a ballot.

Electoral system
The Azores regional parliament elects 57 members through a proportional system in which the 9 islands elect a number of MPs proportional to the number of registered voters. MPs are allocated by using the D'Hondt method. 5 members are also elected for a Compensation constituency.

Current parties in parliament
The parties that up to date of election were represented in the Assembly and their leaders, are:

Opinion Polling
Poll results are listed in the table below in reverse chronological order, showing the most recent first. The highest percentage figure in each polling survey is displayed in bold, and the background shaded in the leading party's colour. In the instance that there is a tie, then no figure is shaded but both are displayed in bold. The lead column on the right shows the percentage-point difference between the two parties with the highest figures. Poll results use the date the survey's fieldwork was done, as opposed to the date of publication.

Vote

Color key:

Results

|-
| colspan=11| 
|-
! rowspan="2" colspan=2 style="background-color:#E9E9E9" align=left|Parties
! rowspan="2" style="background-color:#E9E9E9" align=right|Votes
! rowspan="2" style="background-color:#E9E9E9" align=right|%
! rowspan="2" style="background-color:#E9E9E9" align=right|±pp swing
! colspan="5" style="background-color:#E9E9E9" align="center"|MPs
! rowspan="2" style="background-color:#E9E9E9;text-align:right;" |MPs %/votes %
|- style="background-color:#E9E9E9"
! style="background-color:#E9E9E9;text-align:center;"|2012
! style="background-color:#E9E9E9;text-align:center;"|2016
! style="background-color:#E9E9E9" align=right|±
! style="background-color:#E9E9E9" align=right|%
! style="background-color:#E9E9E9" align=right|±
|-
| 
|43,274||46.43||2.6||31||30||1||52.63||1.8||1.13
|-
| 
|28,793||30.90||2.1||20||19||1||33.33||1.8||1.08
|-
| 
|6,674||7.16||1.6||3||4||1||7.02||1.8||0.98
|-
| 
|3,414||3.66||1.4||1||2||1||3.51||1.8||0.96
|-
| 
|2,437||2.61||0.7||1||1||0||1.75||0.0||0.67
|-
| 
|1,342||1.44||0.8||0||0||0||0.00||0.0||0.0
|-
| 
|866||0.93||0.8||1||1||0||1.75||0.0||1.88
|-
| 
|451||0.48||||||0||||0.00||||0.0
|-
| 
|343||0.37||0.4||0||0||0||0.00||0.0||0.0
|-
| 
|299||0.32||0.0||0||0||0||0.00||0.0||0.0
|-
| style="width:10px; background:#00CD8C; text-align:center;"| 
| style="text-align:left;" |FREE/Time to move Forward 
|227||0.24||||||0||||0.00||||0.0
|-
| 
|83||0.09||||||0||||0.00||||0.0
|-
| 
|67||0.07||||||0||||0.00||||0.0
|-
|colspan=2 align=left style="background-color:#E9E9E9"|Total valid
|width="50" align="right" style="background-color:#E9E9E9"|88,270
|width="40" align="right" style="background-color:#E9E9E9"|94.69
|width="40" align="right" style="background-color:#E9E9E9"|0.8
|width="40" align="right" style="background-color:#E9E9E9"|57|width="40" align="right" style="background-color:#E9E9E9"|57|width="40" align="right" style="background-color:#E9E9E9"|0|width="40" align="right" style="background-color:#E9E9E9"|100.00|width="40" align="right" style="background-color:#E9E9E9"|0.0|width="40" align="right" style="background-color:#E9E9E9"|—|-
|colspan=2|Blank ballots
|2,697||2.90||0.3||colspan=6 rowspan=4|
|-
|colspan=2|Invalid ballots
|2,227||2.40||1.1
|-
|colspan=2 align=left style="background-color:#E9E9E9"|Total 
|width="50" align="right" style="background-color:#E9E9E9"|93,194|width="40" align="right" style="background-color:#E9E9E9"|100.00|width="40" align="right" style="background-color:#E9E9E9"|
|-
|colspan=2|Registered voters/turnout
||228,162||40.85||7.0
|-
| colspan=11 align=left|Portuguese Communist Party (1 MPs) and "The Greens" (0 MPs) ran in coalition.
|-
| colspan=11 align=left | Source: Comissão Nacional de Eleições
|}

Distribution by constituency

|- class="unsortable"
!rowspan=2|Constituency!!%!!S!!%!!S!!%!!S!!%!!S!!%!!S!!%!!S
!rowspan=2|TotalS
|- class="unsortable" style="text-align:center;"
!colspan=2 | PS
!colspan=2 | PSD
!colspan=2 | CDS-PP
!colspan=2 | BE
!colspan=2 | CDU
!colspan=2 | PPM
|-
| style="text-align:left;" | Corvo
| style="background:; color:white;"|36.7
| 1| 26.2
| -
|colspan="2" bgcolor="#AAAAAA"|
| 0.4
| -
| 1.6
| -
| 32.0
| 1| 2|-
| style="text-align:left;" | Faial
| 32.6
| 2| style="background:; color:white;"|41.2
| 2| 6.5
| -
| 6.4
| -
| 4.6
| -
| 1.5
| -
| 4|-
| style="text-align:left;" | Flores
| 23.7
| 1| 21.0
| 1| 17.0
| -
| 1.3
| -
| style="background:red; color:white;"|32.5
| 1|colspan="2" bgcolor="#AAAAAA"|
| 3|-
| style="text-align:left;" | Graciosa
| style="background:; color:white;"|54.6
| 2| 36.7
| 1| 1.7
| -
| 1.2
| -
| 0.5
| -
| 0.5
| -
| 3|-
| style="text-align:left;" | Pico
| style="background:; color:white;"|39.5
| 2| 37.8
| 2| 14.1
| -
| 1.1
| -
| 1.5
| -
| 0.4
| -
| 4|-
| style="text-align:left;" | Santa Maria
| style="background:; color:white;"|50.3
| 2| 29.1
| 1| 1.8
| -
| 4.4
| -
| 8.3
| -
| 0.6
| -
| 3|-
| style="text-align:left;" | São Jorge
| style="background:; color:white;"|39.5
| 1| 21.4
| 1| 26.3
| 1| 2.8
| -
| 3.0
| -
| 0.7
| -
| 3|-
| style="text-align:left;" | São Miguel
| style="background:; color:white;"|49.2
| 12| 30.6
| 7| 3.2
| -
| 4.2
| 1| 1.5
| -
| 1.2
| -
| 20|-
| style="text-align:left;" | Terceira
| style="background:; color:white;"|49.0
| 6| 28.8
| 3| 10.1
| 1| 3.1
| -
| 1.5
| -
| 0.3
| -
| 10|-
| style="text-align:left;" | Compensation
| bgcolor="#AAAAAA"|
| 1| bgcolor="#AAAAAA"|
| 1| bgcolor="#AAAAAA"|
| 2| bgcolor="#AAAAAA"|
| 1| bgcolor="#AAAAAA"|
| -
| bgcolor="#AAAAAA"|
| -
| 5|- class="unsortable" style="background:#E9E9E9"
| style="text-align:left;" | Total| style="background:; color:white;"|46.4| 30| 30.9| 19| 7.2| 4| 3.7| 2| 2.6| 1| 0.9| 1| 57'''
|-
| colspan=14 style="text-align:left;" | Source: Azores Government
|}

References

External links
Comissão Nacional de Eleições
Legislative Assembly of Azores - Official website

Azores 2016
2016 elections in Portugal
Local and regional elections in Portugal
October 2016 events in Portugal